Mehmet Sak (born 4 April 1990) is a Turkish professional footballer who plays as a midfielder for Kocaelispor.

Club career
A native of İzmir, Sak began his career with local club Altay in 2006. He moved to Bursaspor in January 2011.

On 11 August 2012, he joined Samsunspor on a season-long loan.

References

External links

1990 births
Footballers from İzmir
People from Konak
Living people
Turkish footballers
Turkey youth international footballers
Association football midfielders
Altay S.K. footballers
Bursaspor footballers
Samsunspor footballers
Göztepe S.K. footballers
Bucaspor footballers
Adanaspor footballers
Yeni Malatyaspor footballers
MKE Ankaragücü footballers
Kocaelispor footballers
Süper Lig players
TFF First League players
TFF Second League players